The 1994 Churchill Insurance World Indoor Bowls Championship  was held at Preston Guild Hall, Preston, England, from 21 February until 6 March 1994. Churchill Insurance signed a new three-year deal worth £750,000 to sponsor the event, taking over from Midland Bank.

Andy Thomson won his first title beating Richard Corsie in the final.

In the Men's Pairs final Ian Schuback & Cameron Curtis defeated the defending champions Andy Thomson & Gary Smith.

The Women's World Championship was held in Cumbernauld from April 24–25 and was sponsored by Churchill Insurance. The winner was Jan Woodley.

Winners

Draw and results

Men's singles

Men's Pairs

Women's singles

References

External links
Official website

World Indoor Bowls Championship
1994 in bowls